The Football League Centenary Tournament (also known as the Mercantile Credit Football Festival) was a friendly tournament held from 16 to 17 April 1988 at Wembley Stadium to celebrate the 100th anniversary of the founding of the Football League.  

Despite the hopes of the Football League, the attendances of 41,500 on the first day and 17,000 for the finals meant there was plenty of open spaces to be found around Wembley. The attendance situation was not helped by leading London clubs such as Arsenal, Tottenham Hotspur, West Ham United, and Chelsea all not appearing in the tournament.

The tournament was won by First Division Nottingham Forest, who beat Sheffield Wednesday in the final on penalties. Their success was achieved despite manager Brian Clough not attending the Saturday. Arguably the biggest success story was Division Four side Tranmere Rovers, who a year earlier had almost been relegated out of the Football League. They defeated top-flight sides Wimbledon and Newcastle United, before taking Forest to a penalty shoot-out in the semi-finals.

Background
The centenary of the Football League was marked by a number of events between mid-1987 and 1988, including a match at Wembley between a Football League XI and a Rest of the World XI (featuring Diego Maradona and Gary Lineker) in August 1987, Football League champions Everton facing Bayern Munich in a mid-season challenge match (at a time when English clubs were banned from UEFA competitions) with Everton winning 3–1, and the Football League Centenary Trophy between leading teams held at the start of the 1988–89 season (the final was won by Arsenal against Manchester United in October 1988).  Other announced events, however, including a nationwide series of fun runs, a gala classical music concert at the Royal Albert Hall, and a pop music event at Wembley Arena, never took place.  The celebrations, which were sponsored by Mercantile Credit, were criticised for being overly drawn-out and uninspiring.

The competition 
The Football League Centenary Tournament was originally announced as a six-a-side tournament involving all 92 League teams, affording many the opportunity to play at the national stadium for the first time.  It was subsequently changed to an 11-a-side competition featuring only 16 teams, who qualified based on points accrued from League games during a specified time window.

Qualifiers
The following teams participated in the tournament:

Saturday 16 April 1988
The first day of competition consisted of the opening round and quarter-finals; matches were 40 minutes in duration. Owing to the limited time, seven of the twelve matches ended up drawn (five of them goalless) and required a sudden-death penalty shootout.

Opening round

Quarter finals

Sunday 17 April 1988
The semi-finals and final were played on the Sunday. Matches were 60 minutes long.

Semi-finals

Final

References

General

Specific

Defunct football cup competitions in England
1987–88 in English football
Centennial anniversaries
April 1988 sports events in the United Kingdom